Marrio Reytwan Norman (born August 10, 1986) is an American football defensive back who is currently a free agent. Norman played college football at Coastal Carolina University and attended Greenwood High School in Greenwood, South Carolina. He has also been a member of the West Texas Roughnecks, Georgia Force, Orlando Predators, Cleveland Gladiators, Baltimore Ravens and Saskatchewan Roughriders.

Early years
Norman played high school football for the Greenwood High School Eagles, earning two letters. He earned a spot in the Shrine Bowl of the Carolinas after being named to the High School Sports Report All-State team for the second consecutive year. He also earned Index-Journal Honorable Mention All-State honors two straight years. Norman played most of his senior season with a broken hard, recording 27 solo tackles, an interception and two pass breakups.

College career
Norman played for the Coastal Carolina Chanticleers from 2004 to 2008. He earned First Team All-Big South honors in 2007 after recording 53 tackles.

Professional career

West Texas Roughnecks
Norman played for the West Texas Roughnecks of the Indoor Football League in 2011.

Georgia Force
Norman was signed by the Georgia Force on October 3, 2011.

Orlando Predators
Norman signed with the Orlando Predators on November 7, 2012. He was released by the Predators on April 24, 2013.

Cleveland Gladiators
Norman was signed by the Cleveland Gladiators on May 7, 2013. He was placed on the Gladiators' Other League Exempt list on July 29, 2014.

Baltimore Ravens
Norman was signed by the Baltimore Ravens on July 29, 2014. He was released by the Ravens on August 25, 2014.

Saskatchewan Roughriders
Norman signed with the Saskatchewan Roughriders on May 5, 2015. He was released by the Roughriders on June 21, 2015. He was signed to the Roughriders' practice roster on June 23, 2015. Norman was promoted to the active roster on June 26 and added back to the practice roster on July 4, 2015. He was released by the Roughriders on July 16, 2015.

Cleveland Gladiators
On July 29, 2015, Norman was assigned to the Cleveland Gladiators. He became a free agent after the 2015 season. He was assigned to the Gladiators on July 6, 2017.

Shanghai Skywalkers
Norman was selected by the Shanghai Skywalkers in the second round of the 2017 CAFL Draft.

Albany Empire
On March 23, 2018, Norman was assigned to the Albany Empire.

Washington Valor
On March 6, 2019, Norman was assigned to the Washington Valor.

Personal life
Norman's brothers Josh, Renaldo and Orlando are also athletes. Josh plays for the Carolina Panthers, Renaldo played college basketball at Edward Waters College and Orlando played football at North Carolina A&T State University.<ref>

References

External links
Saskatchewan Roughriders bio
Baltimore Ravens bio
Just Sports Stats
NFL Draft Scout

Living people
1986 births
Players of American football from South Carolina
American football defensive backs
Canadian football defensive backs
African-American players of American football
African-American players of Canadian football
Coastal Carolina Chanticleers football players
Odessa Roughnecks players
Georgia Force players
Orlando Predators players
Cleveland Gladiators players
Saskatchewan Roughriders players
Shanghai Skywalkers players
Albany Empire (AFL) players
Washington Valor players
People from Greenwood, South Carolina
21st-century African-American sportspeople
20th-century African-American people